A free-flow interchange is an interchange in which all roads are grade-separated, and where movement from one road to another does not require the driver to stop for traffic (for example, the interchange may not include traffic lights or unsignalized at-grade intersections).  Free-flow interchanges are less likely to induce traffic congestion than non-free-flow, but are typically more expensive both in money and in land.

Some free-flow interchanges bring additional problems such as weaving or passing lane/fast lane exits (i.e. left exits in areas with right-hand traffic, and vice versa) that may be necessary to avoid additional costs, but lead to congestion and accidents and ultimately to an upgrade to another type of interchange.

A free flow interchange design, called double crossover merging interchange (DCMI), has received a patent. The DCMI includes elements from the diverging diamond interchange (DDI) and the standard diamond interchange. It eliminates the disadvantages of weaving and of merging into the outside lane from which the standard DDI variation suffers.

Examples of free-flow interchanges

 Stack interchange
 Cloverleaf interchange
 Trumpet interchange
 Cloverstack interchange
 Directional T
 Semi-directional T
 Turbine (whirlpool) interchange

Examples of interchanges that are not free-flow

 Diamond interchange
 Partial cloverleaf interchange
 Three-level diamond interchange
 Diverging diamond interchange

References

Road interchanges

da:Motorvejskryds
de:Autobahnkreuz
sv:Motorvägskorsning